, also known as abn, is a Japanese broadcast network affiliated with the ANN. Their headquarters are located in Nagano Prefecture.

History
1991-04-01 It was set up as Nagano Prefecture's fourth broadcasting station.
2006-10-01 its Digital terrestrial television broadcasts begun (Utsukushigahara (Main), Zenkoji-daira, Matsumoto, Okaya-Suwa, Ina, and Iida Stations).

Stations

Analog
Nagano (Utsukushigahara) (main station) JOGH-TV 20ch
Iida 44ch
Zenkoji-daira 50ch
Okaya-Suwa 61ch
Matsumoto 50ch
Ina 61ch
Sanada 44ch
Iiyama 45ch
Saku 36ch
Omachi 62ch
Togura-Kamiyamada 61ch
Karuizawa 59ch
Okaya-Kawagishi 58ch
Yamanouchi 8ch
Togakushi-Jimbadaira 50ch
Omi 43ch
Hakuba 55ch
Akashina 36ch
Nakajo 55ch
Shinshushin-Machi 45ch
Kiso-Fukushima 45ch
Nagano-West 43ch
Mochizuki-Joyama 43ch
Nakagawa-Tajima 60ch
Mure 62ch

Digital (ID:5)
Utsukushigahara (Main Station) JOGH-DTV 18ch
Zenkoji-daira 24ch
Matsumoto 24ch
Okaya-Suwa 41ch
Ina 24ch
Iida 33ch
Sanada 46ch
Yamanouchi 18ch
Saku 21ch

Programs
Yajiuma Plus - from 06:00 until 07:30 on Weekdays
Super Morning - from 07:30 until 09:55 on Weekdays
Wide!Scramble - from 11:30 until 13:05 on Weekdays
abn station - from 18:17 until 18:55 on Weekdays
The Ekimae TV - from 09:30 until 10:20 on Saturdays

Rival Stations
Shin-etsu Broadcasting (SBC)
Nagano Broadcasting Systems (NBS)
TV. Shinshu (TSB)

External links
 Asahi Broadcasting Nagano

All-Nippon News Network
Asahi Shimbun Company
Television stations in Japan
Companies based in Nagano Prefecture
Television channels and stations established in 1991
Mass media in Nagano (city)
1991 establishments in Japan